Galva is a city in Ida County, Iowa, United States. The population was 435 at the time of the 2020 census.

History
Galva was named after Galva, Illinois, the former hometown of a large share of its early settlers.

Geography
Galva is located at  (42.506231, -95.418036).

Demographics

2010 census
As of the census of 2010, there were 434 people, 174 households, and 113 families residing in the city. The racial makeup of the city was 95.4% White, 0.2% African American, 0.7% Native American, 0.2% Asian, 3.2% from other races, and 0.2% from two or more races. Hispanic or Latino of any race were 6.5% of the population.

There were 174 households, of which 36.8% had children under the age of 18 living with them, 55.2% were married couples living together, 5.7% had a female householder with no husband present, 4.0% had a male householder with no wife present, and 35.1% were non-families. 31.0% of all households were made up of individuals, and 13.2% had someone living alone who was 65 years of age or older. The average household size was 2.49 and the average family size was 3.16.

The median age in the city was 34 years. 29.3% of residents were under the age of 18; 7.4% were between the ages of 18 and 24; 22.4% were from 25 to 44; 23.9% were from 45 to 64; and 17.1% were 65 years of age or older. The gender makeup of the city was 48.6% male and 51.4% female.

2000 census
As of the census of 2000, there were 368 people, 164 households, and 115 families residing in the city. The racial makeup of the city was 99.18% White, 0.54% Asian, and 0.27% from two or more races.

There were 164 households, out of which 25.0% had children under the age of 18 living with them, 65.9% were married couples living together, 3.7% had a female householder with no husband present, and 29.3% were non-families. 27.4% of all households were made up of individuals, and 16.5% had someone living alone who was 65 years of age or older. The average household size was 2.24 and the average family size was 2.71.

In the city, the population was spread out, with 20.1% under the age of 18, 7.1% from 18 to 24, 21.5% from 25 to 44, 20.7% from 45 to 64, and 30.7% who were 65 years of age or older. The median age was 46 years. For every 100 females, there were 98.9 males. For every 100 females age 18 and over, there were 98.6 males.

The median income for a household in the city was $30,577, and the median income for a family was $33,438. Males had a median income of $26,250 versus $17,000 for females. The per capita income for the city was $24,062. About 5.4% of families and 6.6% of the population were below the poverty line, including 8.5% of those under age 18 and 1.8% of those age 65 or over.

Education
Galva is served by the Galva–Holstein Community School District. It was established on July 1, 1980, by the merger of the merger of the Galva and Holstein school districts.

References

Cities in Iowa
Cities in Ida County, Iowa